Raya Martin (born 1984) is a Filipino filmmaker. His works include Independencia and Manila, which he codirected with Adolfo Alix, Jr.

References

External links

Filipino film directors
Filipino screenwriters
1984 births
Living people
Filipino male writers
20th-century male writers
21st-century male writers
20th-century Filipino writers
21st-century Filipino writers